Hongnong Wang (弘農王, Prince/King of Hongnong) may refer to:

Liu Bian (176–190), Han dynasty emperor, known as Prince of Hongnong after he was deposed in 189
Yang Wo (886–908), Wu dynasty ruler during the Five Dynasties period, known as Prince/King of Hongnong during his reign (905–908)
Yang Longyan (897–920), Wu dynasty ruler during the Five Dynasties period, known as Prince/King of Hongnong from 908 to 910
Yang Lian (prince) (died 940), Wu dynasty prince during the Five Dynasties period, posthumously created Prince of Hongnong by the Southern Tang dynasty
Yang Bin (died 950), Later Han (Five Dynasties) chief councilor, posthumously created Prince of Hongnong by the Later Zhou dynasty